The Fairmount Historic District is a  historic district located along County Route 517 in the Fairmount section of Tewksbury Township, near Califon, in Hunterdon County, New Jersey. It was added to the National Register of Historic Places on December 20, 1996 for its significance in architecture, exploration/settlement, and industry. The district includes 72 contributing buildings that were deemed to be contributing to the historic character of the area, plus five contributing structures, nine contributing sites, and one contributing object. One contributing building is located in Washington Township, Morris County.

History
The Fairmount Presbyterian Church was founded in 1747 as a German Reformed congregation. By the 1880s, Fairmount had two churches, two stores, a sawmill, gristmill, schoolhouse, and the largest tannery in the county.

Description
The Fairmount United Methodist Church was built in 1868 with Romanesque Revival and Italianate styles. The Fairmount Presbyterian Church was built from 1851 to 1852 with Greek Revival and Shingle styles. The small lime kiln dates to the nineteenth century. The house at 397 Fairmount Road, the single contributing property in Morris County, was built  with Greek Revival style.

Gallery

See also
National Register of Historic Places listings in Hunterdon County, New Jersey
National Register of Historic Places listings in Morris County, New Jersey

References

External links
 
 
 

Tewksbury Township, New Jersey
Washington Township, Morris County, New Jersey
National Register of Historic Places in Hunterdon County, New Jersey
National Register of Historic Places in Morris County, New Jersey
Historic districts on the National Register of Historic Places in New Jersey
New Jersey Register of Historic Places
Queen Anne architecture in New Jersey
Italianate architecture in New Jersey